The Kitchener Canucks were a junior ice hockey team in the Ontario Hockey Association from 1954 to 1956. The team was based in Kitchener, Ontario, Canada and played home games at the Kitchener Memorial Auditorium.

History
The Kitchener Greenshirts changed names becoming the Kitchener Canucks for the 1954-55 season. The Canucks finished last place in the OHA their first year in operation.

Stan Baliuk helped the team finish second place in the league in 1955-56, winning the Eddie Powers Memorial Trophy as the top scorer that year, with 31 goals, 73 assists, totalling 104 points.

Canuck's defenceman Kent Douglas would go on to win the Calder Memorial Trophy as Rookie of the Year in the 1962-63 NHL season, when he played for the Toronto Maple Leafs. Willie O'Ree would become the first black player in the NHL, playing as a winger for the Boston Bruins.

Despite moving up in the standings their second year, they did not make enough money to recover from the financial woes of a very poor first season. In 1956 the team moved to Peterborough, Ontario becoming the Peterborough TPT Petes.

NHL alumni

Yearly Results

Defunct Ontario Hockey League teams
Sport in Kitchener, Ontario
1954 establishments in Ontario
1956 disestablishments in Ontario
Ice hockey clubs established in 1954
Sports clubs disestablished in 1956